Abu Bakr Abdullah ibn Uthman Abi Quhafa (27 October 573 – 23 August 634) was the senior companion and was, through his daughter Aisha, a father-in-law of the Islamic prophet Muhammad, as well as the first Caliph of the Rashidun Caliphate. He is known with the honorific title "al-Siddiq" by Sunni Muslims.
	
Abu Bakr was born in 573 CE to Abu Quhafa and Umm Khayr. He belonged to the tribe of Banu Taym. In the Age of Ignorance, he was a monotheist and condemned idol-worshipping. As a wealthy trader, Abu Bakr used to free slaves. Following his conversion to Islam in 610, Abu Bakr served as a close aide to Muhammad, who bestowed on him the title "al-Siddiq" ('the Truthful/Righteous'). The former took part in almost all battles under the Islamic prophet. He extensively contributed his wealth in support of Muhammad's work and among Muhammad's closest companions. He also accompanied Muhammad on his migration to Medina. By the invitations of Abu Bakr, many prominent Sahabis became Muslims. He remained the closest advisor to Muhammad, being present at almost all his military conflicts. In the absence of Muhammad, Abu Bakr led the prayers and expeditions.

Following Muhammad's death in 632, Abu Bakr succeeded the leadership of the Muslim community as the first Rashidun Caliph. His election was opposed by a large number of rebellious tribal leaders, who had apostatized from Islam.  During his reign, he overcame a number of uprisings, collectively known as the Ridda Wars, as a result of which he was able to consolidate and expand the rule of the Muslim state over the entire Arabian Peninsula. He also commanded the initial incursions into the neighbouring Sassanian and Byzantine empires, which in the years following his death, would eventually result in the Muslim conquests of Persia and the Levant. Apart from politics, Abu Bakr is also credited for the compilation of the Quran, of which he had a personal caliphal codex. Abu Bakr nominated his principal adviser Umar as his successor before dying in August 634. Along with Muhammad, Abu Bakr is buried in the Green Dome at the Al-Masjid an-Nabawi in Medina, the second holiest site in Islam. He died of illness after a reign of 2 years, 2 months and 14 days, the only Rashidun caliph to die of natural causes.

Though the period of his caliphate was short, it included successful invasions of the two most powerful empires of the time, a remarkable achievement in its own right. He set in motion a historical trajectory that in a few decades would lead to one of the largest empires in history. His victory over the local rebel Arab forces is a significant part of Islamic history. Abu Bakr is widely honored among Muslims.

Lineage and title

Abu Bakr's full name was Abdullah ibn Abi Quhafa ibn Amir ibn Amr ibn Ka'b ibn Sa'd ibn Taym ibn Murrah ibn Ka'b ibn Lu'ayy ibn Ghalib ibn Fihr.

In Arabic, the name Abd Allah means "servant of Allah". One of his early titles, preceding his conversion to Islam, was Ateeq, meaning "saved one". Muhammad later restated this title when he said that Abu Bakr is the "Ateeq". He was called Al-Siddiq (the truthful) by Muhammad after he believed him in the event of Isra and Mi'raj when other people didn't, and Ali confirmed that title several times. He was also reportedly referred to in the Quran as the "second of the two in the cave" in reference to the event of hijra, where with Muhammad he hid in the cave in Jabal Thawr from the Meccan party that was sent after them.

Early life
Abu Bakr was born in Mecca sometime in 573 CE, to a rich family in the Banu Taym tribe of the Quraysh tribal confederacy. His father's name was Uthman and given the kunya Abu Quhafa, and his mother was Salma bint Sakhar who was given the laqab of Umm ul-Khair.

He spent his early childhood like other Arab children of the time, among the Bedouins who called themselves Ahl-i-Ba'eer- the people of the camel, and developed a particular fondness for camels. In his early years he played with the camel calves and goats, and his love for camels earned him the nickname (kunya) "Abu Bakr", the father of the camel's calf.

Like other children of the rich Meccan merchant families, Abu Bakr was literate and developed a fondness for poetry. He used to attend the annual fair at Ukaz, and participate in poetical symposia. He had a very good memory and had a good knowledge of the genealogy of the Arab tribes, their stories and their politics.

A story is preserved that once when he was a child, his father took him to the Kaaba, and asked him to pray before the idols. His father went away to attend to some other business, and Abu Bakr was left alone. Addressing an idol, Abu Bakr said "O my God, I am in need of beautiful clothes; bestow them on me". The idol remained indifferent. Then he addressed another idol, saying, "O God, give me some delicious food. See that I am so hungry". The idol remained cold. That exhausted the patience of young Abu Bakr. He lifted a stone, and, addressing an idol, said, "Here I am aiming a stone; if you are a god protect yourself". Abu Bakr hurled the stone at the idol and left the Kaaba. Regardless, it recorded that prior to converting to Islam, Abu Bakr practiced as a hanif and never worshipped idols.

Acceptance of Islam

On his return from a business trip in Yemen, friends informed him that in his absence, Muhammad had declared himself the messenger of God and proclaimed a new religion. The historian Al-Tabari, in his Tarikh al-Tabari, quotes from Muhammad ibn Sa'd ibn Abi Waqqas, who said: 

Some Sunni and all the Shi'a believe that the second person to publicly accept Muhammed as the messenger of God was Ali ibn Abi Talib, the first being Muhammad's wife Khadija. Ibn Kathir, in his Al Bidaya Wal Nihayah, disregards this. He stated that the first woman to embrace Islam was Khadijah. Zayd ibn Harithah was the first freed slave to embrace Islam. Ali ibn Abi Talib was the first child to embrace Islam, for he has not even reached the age of puberty at that time, while Abu Bakr was the first free man to embrace Islam.

Subsequent life in Mecca

His wife Qutaylah bint Abd-al-Uzza did not accept Islam and he divorced her. His other wife, Um Ruman, became a Muslim. All his children accepted Islam except Abd al-Rahman, from whom Abu Bakr disassociated himself. His conversion also brought many people to Islam. He persuaded his intimate friends to convert, and presented Islam to other friends in such a way that many of them also accepted the faith. Those who converted to Islam at the insistence of Abu Bakr were:
 Uthman Ibn Affan (who would become the 3rd Caliph)
 Al-Zubayr (who played a part in the Muslim conquest of Egypt)
 Talha ibn Ubayd-Allah, his cousin and an important companion of the prophet.
 'Abd al-Rahman ibn 'Awf (who would remain an important part of the Rashidun Caliphate)
 Sa'd ibn Abi Waqqas (who played a leading role in the Islamic conquest of Persia)
 Abu Ubaidah ibn al-Jarrah (who was a commander in chief of the Rashidun army in Levant)
 Abu Salama, he was a foster brother of prophet Muhammad.
 Khalid ibn Sa'id, (who acted as a general under the Rashidun army in Syria)

Abu Bakr's acceptance proved to be a milestone in Muhammad's mission. Slavery was common in Mecca, and many slaves accepted Islam. When an ordinary free man accepted Islam, despite opposition, he would enjoy the protection of his tribe. For slaves, however, there was no such protection and they commonly experienced persecution. Abu Bakr felt compassion for slaves, so he purchased eight (four men and four women) and then freed them, paying 40,000 dinar for their freedom.

The men were:
 Bilal ibn Rabah
 Abu Fukayha
 Ammar ibn Yasir
 Abu Fuhayra
The women were:
 Lubaynah
 Al-Nahdiah
 Umm Ubays
 Harithah bint al-Muammil

Most of the slaves liberated by Abu Bakr were either women or old and frail men. When the father of Abu Bakr asked him why he didn't liberate strong and young slaves, who could be a source of strength for him, Abu Bakr replied that he was freeing the slaves for the sake of God, and not for his own sake.

Persecution by the Quraysh, 613

For three years after the birth of Islam, Muslims kept their faith private. In 613, according to Islamic tradition, Muhammad was commanded by God to call people to Islam openly. The first public address inviting people to offer allegiance to Muhammad was delivered by Abu Bakr. In a fit of fury, the young men of the Quraysh tribe rushed at Abu Bakr and beat him until he lost consciousness. Following this incident, Abu Bakr's mother converted to Islam. Abu Bakr was persecuted many times by the Quraysh. Though Abu Bakr's beliefs would have been defended by his own clan, it would not be so for the entire Quraysh tribe.

Last years in Mecca
In 617, the Quraysh enforced a boycott against the Banu Hashim. Muhammad along with his supporters from Banu Hashim, were cut off in a pass away from Mecca. All social relations with the Banu Hashim were cut off and their state was that of imprisonment. Before it many Muslims migrated to Abyssinia (now Ethiopia). Abu Bakr, feeling distressed, set out for Yemen and then to Abyssinia from there. He met a friend of his named Ad-Dughna (chief of the Qarah tribe) outside Mecca, who invited Abu Bakr to seek his protection against the Quraysh. Abu Bakr went back to Mecca, it was a relief for him, but soon due to the pressure of Quraysh, Ad-Dughna was forced to renounce his protection. Once again the Quraysh were free to persecute Abu Bakr.

In 620, Muhammad's uncle and protector, Abu Talib ibn Abd al-Muttalib, and Muhammad's wife Khadija died. Abu Bakr's daughter Aisha was betrothed to Muhammad; however, it was decided that the actual marriage ceremony would be held later. In 620 Abu Bakr was the first person to testify to Muhammad's Isra and Mi'raj (Night Journey).

Migration to Medina

In 622, on the invitation of the Muslims of Medina, Muhammad ordered Muslims to migrate to Medina. The migration began in batches. Ali was the last to remain in Mecca, entrusted with responsibility for settling any loans the Muslims had taken out, and famously slept in the bed of Muhammad when the Quraysh, led by Ikrima, attempted to murder Muhammad as he slept. Meanwhile, Abu Bakr accompanied Muhammad to Medina. Due to the danger posed by the Quraysh, they did not take the road, but moved in the opposite direction, taking refuge in a cave in Jabal Thawr, some five miles south of Mecca. Abd Allah ibn Abi Bakr, the son of Abu Bakr, would listen to the plans and discussions of the Quraysh, and at night he would carry the news to the fugitives in the cave. Asma bint Abi Bakr, the daughter of Abu Bakr, brought them meals every day. Aamir, a servant of Abu Bakr, would bring a flock of goats to the mouth of the cave every night, where they were milked. The Quraysh sent search parties in all directions. One party came close to the entrance to the cave, but was unable to see them. Due to this, Quranic verse  was revealed. Aisha, Abu Saʽid al-Khudri and Abd Allah ibn Abbas in interpreting this verse said that Abu Bakr was the companion who stayed with Muhammad in the cave.

After staying at the cave for three days and three nights, Abu Bakr and Muhammad proceed to Medina, staying for some time at Quba, a suburb of Medina.

Life in Medina
In Medina, Muhammad decided to construct a mosque. A piece of land was chosen and the price of the land was paid for by Abu Bakr. The Muslims, including Abu Bakr, constructed a mosque named Al-Masjid al-Nabawi at the site. Abu Bakr was paired with Khaarijah bin Zaid Ansari (who was from Medina) as a brother in faith. Abu Bakr's relationship with Khaarijah was most cordial, which was further strengthened when Abu Bakr married Habiba, a daughter of Khaarijah. Khaarijah bin Zaid Ansari lived at Sunh, a suburb of Medina, and Abu Bakr also settled there. After Abu Bakr's family arrived in Medina, he bought another house near Muhammad's.

While the climate of Mecca was dry, the climate of Medina was damp and because of this, most of the migrants fell sick on arrival. Abu Bakr contracted a fever for several days, during which time he was attended to by Khaarijah and his family. In Mecca, Abu Bakr was a wholesale trader in cloth and he started the same business in Medina. He opened his new store at Sunh, and from there cloth was supplied to the market at Medina. Soon his business flourished. Early in 623, Abu Bakr's daughter Aisha, who was already married to Muhammad, was sent on to Muhammad's house after a simple marriage ceremony, further strengthening relations between Abu Bakr and Muhammad.

Military campaigns under Muhammad

Battle of Badr

In 624, Abu Bakr was involved in the first battle between the Muslims and the Quraysh of Mecca, known as the Battle of Badr, but did not fight, instead acting as one of the guards of Muhammad's tent. In relation to this, Ali allegedly later asked his associates as to who they thought was the bravest among men. Everyone stated that Ali was the bravest of all men. Ali then replied:

In Sunni accounts, during one such attack, two discs from Abu Bakr's shield penetrated into Muhammad's cheeks. Abu Bakr went forward with the intention of extracting these discs but Abu Ubaidah ibn al-Jarrah requested he leave the matter to him, losing his two incisors during the process. In these stories subsequently Abu Bakr, along with other companions, led Muhammad to a place of safety.

Battle of Uhud

In 625, he participated in the Battle of Uhud, in which the majority of the Muslims were routed and he himself was wounded. Before the battle had begun, his son Abd al-Rahman, at that time still non-Muslim and fighting on the side of the Quraysh, came forward and threw down a challenge for a duel. Abu Bakr accepted the challenge but was stopped by Muhammad. Later, Abd al-Rahman approached his father and said to him "You were exposed to me as a target, but I turned away from you and did not kill you." To this Abu Bakr replied "However, if you had been exposed to me as a target I would not have turned away from you."
In the second phase of the battle, Khalid ibn al-Walid's cavalry attacked the Muslims from behind, changing a Muslim victory to defeat. Many fled from the battlefield, including Abu Bakr. However, according to his own account, he was "the first to return".

Battle of the Trench

In 627 he participated in the Battle of the Trench and also in the Invasion of Banu Qurayza. In the Battle of the Trench, Muhammad divided the ditch into a number of sectors and a contingent was posted to guard each sector. One of these contingents was under the command of Abu Bakr. The enemy made frequent assaults in an attempt to cross the ditch, all of which were repulsed. To commemorate this event a mosque, later known as 'Masjid-i-Siddiq', was constructed at the site where Abu Bakr had repulsed the charges of the enemy.

Battle of Khaybar

Abu Bakr took part in the Battle of Khaybar. Khaybar had eight fortresses, the strongest and most well-guarded of which was called Al-Qamus. Muhammad sent Abu Bakr with a group of warriors to attempt to take it, but they were unable to do so. Muhammad also sent Umar with a group of warriors, but Umar could not conquer Al-Qamus either. Some other Muslims also attempted to capture the fort, but they were unsuccessful as well. Finally, Muhammad sent Ali, who defeated the enemy leader, Marhab.

Military campaigns during final years of Muhammad

In 629 Muhammad sent 'Amr ibn al-'As to Zaat-ul-Sallasal, followed by Abu Ubaidah ibn al-Jarrah in response to a call for reinforcements. Abu Bakr and Umar commanded an army under al-Jarrah, and they attacked and defeated the enemy.

In 630, when the Muslims conquered Mecca, Abu Bakr was part of the army. Before the conquest of Mecca his father Abu Quhafa converted to Islam.

Battles of Hunayn and Ta'if

In 630, the Muslim army was ambushed by archers from the local tribes as it passed through the valley of Hunayn, some eleven miles northeast of Mecca. Taken unaware, the advance guard of the Muslim army fled in panic. There was considerable confusion, and the camels, horses and men ran into one another in an attempt to seek cover. Muhammad, however, stood firm. Only nine companions remained around him, including Abu Bakr. Under Muhammad's instruction, his uncle Abbas shouted at the top of his voice, "O Muslims, come to the Prophet of Allah". The call was heard by the Muslim soldiers and they gathered beside Muhammad. When the Muslims had gathered in sufficient number, Muhammad ordered a charge against the enemy. In the hand-to-hand fight that followed the tribes were routed and they fled to Autas.

Muhammad posted a contingent to guard the Hunayn pass and led the main army to Autas. In the confrontation at Autas the tribes could not withstand the Muslim onslaught. Believing continued resistance useless, the tribes broke camp and retired to Ta'if.

Abu Bakr was commissioned by Muhammad to lead the attack against Ta'if. The tribes shut themselves in the fort and refused to come out in the open. The Muslims employed catapults, but without tangible result. The Muslims attempted to use a testudo formation, in which a group of soldiers shielded by a cover of cowhide advanced to set fire to the gate. However, the enemy threw red hot scraps of iron on the testudo, rendering it ineffective.

The siege dragged on for two weeks, and still there was no sign of weakness in the fort. Muhammad held a council of war. Abu Bakr advised that the siege might be raised and that God make arrangements for the fall of the fort. The advice was accepted, and in February 630, the siege of Ta'if was raised and the Muslim army returned to Mecca. A few days later Malik bin Auf, the commander, came to Mecca and became a Muslim.

Abu Bakr as Amir-ul-Hajj
In 631 AD, Muhammad sent from Medina a delegation of three hundred Muslims to perform the Hajj according to the new Islamic way and appointed Abu Bakr as the leader of the delegation. The day after Abu Bakr and his party had left for the Hajj, Muhammad received a new revelation: Surah Tawbah, the ninth chapter of the Quran. It is related that when this revelation came, someone suggested to Muhammad that he should send news of it to Abu Bakr. Muhammad said that only a man of his house could proclaim the revelation.

Muhammad summoned Ali, and asked him to proclaim a portion of Surah Tawbah to the people on the day of sacrifice when they assembled at Mina. Ali went forth on Muhammad's slit-eared camel, and overtook Abu Bakr. When Ali joined the party, Abu Bakr wanted to know whether he had come to give orders or to convey them. Ali said that he had not come to replace Abu Bakr as Amir-ul-Hajj, and that his only mission was to convey a special message to the people on behalf of Muhammad.

At Mecca, Abu Bakr presided at the Hajj ceremony, and Ali read the proclamation on behalf of Muhammad. The main points of the proclamation were:

Henceforward the non-Muslims were not to be allowed to visit the Kaaba or perform the pilgrimage.
No one should circumambulate the Kaaba naked.
Polytheism was not to be tolerated. Where the Muslims had any agreement with the polytheists such agreements would be honoured for the stipulated periods. Where there were no agreements a grace period of four months was provided and thereafter no quarter was to be given to the polytheists.

From the day this proclamation was made a new era dawned, and Islam alone was to be supreme in Arabia.

Expedition of Abu Bakr As-Siddiq

Abu Bakr led one military expedition, the Expedition of Abu Bakr As-Siddiq, which took place in Najd, in July 628 (third month 7AH in the Islamic calendar). Abu Bakr led a large company in Nejd on the order of Muhammad. Many were killed and taken prisoner. The Sunni Hadith collection Sunan Abu Dawud mentions the event.

Expedition of Usama bin Zayd

In 632, during the final weeks of his life, Muhammad ordered an expedition into Syria to avenge the defeat of the Muslims in the Battle of Mu'tah some years previously. Leading the campaign was Usama ibn Zayd, whose father, Muhammad's erstwhile adopted son Zayd ibn Harithah, had been killed in the earlier conflict. No more than twenty years old, inexperienced and untested, Usama's appointment was controversial, becoming especially problematic when veterans such as Abu Bakr, Abu Ubaidah ibn al-Jarrah and Sa'd ibn Abi Waqqas were placed under his command. Nevertheless, the expedition was dispatched, though soon after setting off, news was received of Muhammad's death, forcing the army to return to Medina. The campaign was not reengaged until after Abu Bakr's ascension to the caliphate, at which point he chose to reaffirm Usama's command, which ultimately led to its success.

Death of Muhammad
There are a number of traditions regarding Muhammad's final days which have been used to reinforce the idea of the great friendship and trust which is said to have existed between him and Abu Bakr. In one such episode, as Muhammad was nearing death, he found himself unable to lead prayers as he usually would. He instructed Abu Bakr to take his place, ignoring concerns from Aisha that her father was too emotionally delicate for the role. Abu Bakr subsequently took up the position, and when Muhammad entered the prayer hall one morning during Fajr prayers, Abu Bakr attempted to step back to let him to take up his normal place and lead. Muhammad, however, allowed him to continue. In a related incident, around this time, Muhammad ascended the pulpit and addressed the congregation, saying, "God has given his servant the choice between this world and that which is with God and he has chosen the latter." Abu Bakr, understanding this to mean that Muhammad did not have long to live, responded "Nay, we and our children will be your ransom." Muhammad consoled his friend and ordered that all the doors leading to the mosque be closed aside from that which led from Abu Bakr's house, "for I know no one who is a better friend to me than he."

Upon Muhammad's death, the Muslim community was unprepared for the loss of its leader and many experienced a profound shock. Umar was particularly affected, instead declaring that Muhammad had gone to consult with God and would soon return, threatening anyone who would say that Muhammad was dead. Abu Bakr, having returned to Medina, calmed Umar by showing him Muhammad's body, convincing him of his death. He then addressed those who had gathered at the mosque, saying, "If anyone worships Muhammad, Muhammad is dead. If anyone worships God, God is alive, immortal", thus putting an end to any idolising impulse in the population. He then concluded with verses from the Quran: "(O Muhammad) Verily you will die, and they also will die.", "Muhammad is no more than an Apostle; and indeed many Apostles have passed away, before him, If he dies Or is killed, will you then Turn back on your heels? And he who turns back On his heels, not the least Harm will he do to Allah And Allah will give reward to those Who are grateful."

Saqifa

In the immediate aftermath of the death of Muhammad, a gathering of the Ansar (natives of Medina) took place in the Saqifah (courtyard) of the Banu Sa'ida clan. The general belief at the time was that the purpose of the meeting was for the Ansar to decide on a new leader of the Muslim community among themselves, with the intentional exclusion of the Muhajirun (migrants from Mecca), though this has later become the subject of debate.

Nevertheless, Abu Bakr and Umar, upon learning of the meeting, became concerned of a potential coup and hastened to the gathering. Upon arriving, Abu Bakr addressed the assembled men with a warning that an attempt to elect a leader outside of Muhammad's own tribe, the Quraysh, would likely result in dissension, as only they can command the necessary respect among the community. He then took Umar and Abu Ubaidah, by the hand and offered them to the Ansar as potential choices. Habab ibn Mundhir, a veteran from the battle of Badr, countered with his own suggestion that the Quraysh and the Ansar choose a leader each from among themselves, who would then rule jointly. The group grew heated upon hearing this proposal and began to argue amongst themselves. The orientalist William Muir gives the following observation of the situation:

Umar hastily took Abu Bakr's hand and swore his own allegiance to the latter, an example followed by the gathered men. The meeting broke up when a violent scuffle erupted between Umar and the chief of the Banu Sa'ida, Sa'd ibn Ubadah. This may indicate that the choice of Abu Bakr may not have been unanimous, with emotions running high as a result of the disagreement.

Abu Bakr was near-universally accepted as head of the Muslim community (under the title of Caliph) as a result of Saqifah, though he did face contention because of the rushed nature of the event. Several companions, most prominent among them being Ali ibn Abi Talib, initially refused to acknowledge his authority. Among Shi'ites, it is also argued that Ali had previously been appointed as Muhammad's heir, with the election being seen as in contravention to the latter's wishes. Abu Bakr later sent Umar to confront Ali, resulting in an altercation which may have involved violence. However, after six months the group made peace with Abu Bakr and Ali offered him his allegiance.

Reign
After assuming the office of Caliph, Abu Bakr's first address was as follows:

Abu Bakr's reign lasted for 27 months, during which he crushed the rebellion of the Arab tribes throughout the Arabian Peninsula in the successful Ridda Wars. In the last months of his rule, he sent Khalid ibn al-Walid on conquests against the Sassanid Empire in Mesopotamia and against the Byzantine Empire in Syria. This would set in motion a historical trajectory (continued later on by Umar and Uthman ibn Affan) that in just a few short decades would lead to one of the largest empires in history. He had little time to pay attention to the administration of state, though state affairs remained stable during his Caliphate. On the advice of Umar and Abu Ubaidah ibn al-Jarrah, he agreed to draw a salary from the state treasury and discontinue his cloth trade.

Ridda wars

Troubles emerged soon after Abu Bakr's succession, with several Arab tribes launching revolts, threatening the unity and stability of the new community and state. These insurgencies and the caliphate's responses to them are collectively referred to as the Ridda wars ("Wars of Apostasy").

The opposition movements came in two forms. One type challenged the political power of the nascent caliphate as well as the religious authority of Islam with the acclamation of rival ideologies, headed by political leaders who claimed the mantle of prophethood in the manner that Muhammad had done. These rebellions include:
that of the Banu Asad ibn Khuzaymah headed by Tulayha ibn Khuwaylid
that of the Banu Hanifa headed by Musaylimah
those from among the Banu Taghlib and the Bani Tamim headed by Sajah
that of the Al-Ansi headed by Al-Aswad Al-Ansi
These leaders are all denounced in Islamic histories as "false prophets".

The second form of opposition movement was more strictly political in character. Some of the revolts of this type took the form of tax rebellions in Najd among tribes such as the Banu Fazara and Banu Tamim. Other dissenters, while initially allied to the Muslims, used Muhammad's death as an opportunity to attempt to restrict the growth of the new Islamic state. They include some of the Rabīʿa in Bahrayn, the Azd in Oman, as well as among the Kindah and Khawlan in Yemen.

Abu Bakr, likely understanding that maintaining firm control over the disparate tribes of Arabia was crucial to ensuring the survival of the state, suppressed the insurrections with military force. He dispatched Khalid ibn Walid and a body of troops to subdue the uprisings in Najd as well as that of Musaylimah, who posed the most serious threat. Concurrent to this, Shurahbil ibn Hasana and Al-Ala'a Al-Hadrami were sent to Bahrayn, while Ikrimah ibn Abi Jahl, Hudhayfah al-Bariqi and Arfaja al-Bariqi were instructed to conquer Oman. Finally, Al-Muhajir ibn Abi Umayya and Khalid ibn Asid were sent to Yemen to aid the local governor in re-establishing control. Abu Bakr also made use of diplomatic means in addition to military measures. Like Muhammad before him, he used marriage alliances and financial incentives to bind former enemies to the caliphate. For instance, a member of the Banu Hanifa who had sided with the Muslims was rewarded with the granting of a land estate. Similarly, a Kindah rebel named Al-Ash'ath ibn Qays, after repenting and re-joining Islam, was later given land in Medina as well as the hand of Abu Bakr's sister Umm Farwa in marriage.

At their heart, the Ridda movements were challenges to the political and religious supremacy of the Islamic state. Through his success in suppressing the insurrections, Abu Bakr had in effect continued the political consolidation which had begun under Muhammad's leadership with relatively little interruption. By wars' end, he had established an Islamic hegemony over the entirety of the Arabian Peninsula.

Expeditions into Persia and Syria
With Arabia having united under a single centralised state with a formidable military, the region could now be viewed as a potential threat to the neighbouring Byzantine and Sasanian empires. It may be that Abu Bakr, reasoning that it was inevitable that one of these powers would launch a pre-emptive strike against the youthful caliphate, decided that it was better to deliver the first blow himself. Regardless of the caliph's motivations, in 633, small forces were dispatched into Iraq and Palestine, capturing several towns. Though the Byzantines and Sassanians were certain to retaliate, Abu Bakr had reason to be confident; the two empires were militarily exhausted after centuries of war against each other, making it likely that any forces sent to Arabia would be diminished and weakened.

A more pressing advantage though was the effectiveness of the Muslim fighters as well as their zeal, the latter of which was partially based on their certainty of the righteousness of their cause. Additionally, the general belief among the Muslims was that the community must be defended at all costs. Historian Theodor Nöldeke gives the somewhat controversial opinion that this religious fervour was intentionally used to maintain the enthusiasm and momentum of the ummah:

Though Abu Bakr had started these initial conflicts which eventually resulted in the Islamic conquests of Persia and the Levant, he did not live to see those regions conquered by Islam, instead leaving the task to his successors.

Preservation of the Quran

Abu Bakr was instrumental in preserving the Quran in written form. It is said that after the hard-won victory over Musaylimah in the Battle of Yamama in 632, Umar saw that some five hundred of the Muslims who had memorised the Quran had been killed. Fearing that it may become lost or corrupted, Umar requested that Abu Bakr authorise the compilation and preservation of the scriptures in written format. The caliph was initially hesitant, being quoted as saying, "how can we do that which the Messenger of Allah, may Allah bless and keep him, did not himself do?" He eventually relented, however, and appointed Zayd ibn Thabit, who had previously served as one of the scribes of Muhammad, for the task of gathering the scattered verses. The fragments were recovered from every quarter, including from the ribs of palm branches, scraps of leather, stone tablets and "from the hearts of men". The collected work was transcribed onto sheets and verified through comparison with Quran memorisers. The finished codex, termed the Mus'haf, was presented to Abu Bakr, who prior to his death, bequeathed it to his successor Umar. Upon Umar's own death, the Mus'haf was left to his daughter Hafsa, who had been one of the wives of Muhammad. It was this volume, borrowed from Hafsa, which formed the basis of Uthman's legendary prototype, which became the definitive text of the Quran. All later editions are derived from this original.

Death

On 23 August 634, Abu Bakr fell sick and did not recover. He developed a high fever and was confined to bed. His illness was prolonged, and when his condition worsened, he felt that his end was near. Realising this, he sent for Ali and requested him to perform his ghusl since Ali had also done it for Muhammad.

Abu Bakr felt that he should nominate his successor so that the issue should not be a cause of dissension among the Muslims after his death, though there was already controversy over Ali not having been appointed. He appointed Umar for this role after discussing the matter with some companions. Some of them favoured the nomination and others disliked it, due to the tough nature of Umar.

Abu Bakr thus dictated his last testament to Uthman ibn Affan as follows:

Umar led the funeral prayer for him and he was buried beside the grave of Muhammad.

Appearance
The historian Al-Tabari, in regards to Abu Bakr's appearance, records the following interaction between Aisha and her paternal nephew, Abd Allah ibn Abd al-Rahman ibn Abi Bakr:

When she was in her howdah and saw a man from among the Arabs passing by, she said, "I have not seen a man more like Abu Bakr than this one." We said to her, "Describe Abu Bakr." She said, "A slight, white man, thin-bearded and bowed. His waist wrapper would not hold but would fall down around his loins. He had a lean face, sunken eyes, a bulging forehead, and trembling knuckles."

Referencing another source, Al-Tabari further describes him as being "white mixed with yellowness, of good build, slight, 
bowed, thin, tall like a male palm tree, hook-nosed, lean-faced, sunken-eyed, thin-shanked, and strong-thighed. He used to dye himself with henna and black dye."

Legacy
Though the period of his caliphate covers only two years, two months and fifteen days, it included successful invasions of the two most powerful empires of the time: the Sassanid Empire and Byzantine Empire.

Abu Bakr had the distinction of being the first Caliph in the history of Islam and also the first Caliph to nominate a successor. He was the only Caliph in the history of Islam who refunded to the state treasury at the time of his death the entire amount of the allowance that he had drawn during the period of his caliphate. He has the distinction of purchasing the land for Al-Masjid al-Nabawi.

Sunni view
Sunni Muslims view Abu Bakr as one of the best men of all the human beings after the prophets. They also consider Abu Bakr as one of the Ten Promised Paradise (al-‘Ashara al-Mubashshara) whom Muhammad had testified were destined for Paradise. He is regarded as the "Successor of Allah's Messenger" (Khalifa Rasulullah), and first of the Rightly Guided Caliphs—i.e. Rashidun—and as the rightful successor to Muhammad. Abu Bakr had always been the closest friend and confidant of Muhammad throughout his life, being beside Muhammad at every major event. It was Abu Bakr's wisdom that Muhammad always honored. Abu Bakr is regarded among the best of Muhammad's followers; as Umar ibn al-Khattab stated, "If the faith of Abu Bakr was weighed against the faith of the people of the earth, the faith of Abu Bakr would outweigh the others."

Shia view

Shia Muslims believe that Ali ibn Abi Talib was supposed to assume the leadership, and that he had been publicly and unambiguously appointed by Muhammad as his successor at Ghadir Khumm. It is also believed that Abu Bakr and Umar conspired to take over power in the Muslim nation after Muhammad's death, in a coup d'état against Ali.

Most Twelver Shia (as the main branch of Shia Islam, with 85% of all Shias) have a negative view of Abu Bakr because, after Muhammad's death, Abu Bakr refused to grant Muhammad's daughter, Fatimah, the lands of the village of Fadak which she claimed her father had given to her as a gift before his death. He refused to accept the testimony of her witnesses, so she claimed the land would still belong to her as inheritance from her deceased father. However, Abu Bakr replied by saying that Muhammad had told him that the prophets of God do not leave as inheritance any worldly possessions and on this basis he refused to give her the lands of Fadak. However, as Sayed Ali Asgher Razwy notes in his book A Restatement of the History of Islam & Muslims, Muhammad inherited a maid servant, five camels, and ten sheep. Shia Muslims believe that prophets can receive inheritance, and can pass on inheritance to others as well. In addition, Shias claim that Muhammad had given Fadak to Fatimah during his lifetime, and Fadak was therefore a gift to Fatimah, not inheritance. This view has also been supported by the Abbasid ruler Al-Ma'mun.

Twelvers also accuse Abu Bakr of participating in the burning of the house of Ali and Fatima. The Twelver Shia believe that Abu Bakr sent Khalid ibn Walid to crush those who were in favour of Ali's caliphate (see Ridda wars). The Twelver Shia strongly refute the idea that Abu Bakr or Umar were instrumental in the collection or preservation of the Quran, claiming that they should have accepted the copy of the book in the possession of Ali.

However, Sunnis argue that Ali and Abu Bakr were not enemies and that Ali named his sons Abi Bakr in honor of Abu Bakr. After the death of Abu Bakr, Ali raised Abu Bakr's son Muhammad ibn Abi Bakr. The Twelver Shia view Muhammad ibn Abi Bakr as one of the greatest companions of Ali. When Muhammad ibn Abi Bakr was killed by the Umayyads, Aisha, the third wife of Muhammad, raised and taught her nephew Qasim ibn Muhammad ibn Abi Bakr. Qasim ibn Muhammad ibn Abu Bakr's mother was from Ali's family and Qasim's daughter Farwah bint al-Qasim was married to Muhammad al-Baqir and was the mother of Jafar al-Sadiq. Therefore, Qasim ibn Muhammad ibn Abu Bakr was the grandson of Abu Bakr and the grandfather of Jafar al-Sadiq.

Zaydi Shias, the largest group amongst the Shia before the Safavid dynasty and currently the second-largest group (although its population is only about 5% of all Shia Muslims), believe that on the last hour of Zayd ibn Ali (the uncle of Jafar al-Sadiq), he was betrayed by the people in Kufa who said to him: "May God have mercy on you! What do you have to say on the matter of Abu Bakr and Umar ibn al-Khattab?" Zayd ibn Ali said, "I have not heard anyone in my family renouncing them both nor saying anything but good about them...when they were entrusted with government they behaved justly with the people and acted according to the Quran and the Sunnah".

See also

 Laqit bin Malik Al-Azdi, rebel during Abu Bakr's Caliphate
 List of Sahabah
 Sunni view of the Sahaba
 Muadh ibn Jabal
 Sermon of Fadak

Notes

References

Bibliography

 
 Walker, Adam, Abu Bakr al-Siddiq, in Muhammad in History, Thought, and Culture: An Encyclopedia of the Prophet of God (2 vols.), Edited by C. Fitzpatrick and A. Walker, Santa Barbara, ABC-CLIO, 2014.

Further reading

Online
 Abū Bakr Muslim caliph, in Encyclopædia Britannica Online, by The Editors of Encyclopædia Britannica, Yamini Chauhan, Aakanksha Gaur, Gloria Lotha, Noah Tesch and Amy Tikkanen

External links

 
573 births
634 deaths
Arab Muslims
People from Mecca
Rashidun caliphs
 
7th-century caliphs
Sahabah who participated in the battle of Uhud
Sahabah who participated in the battle of Badr
People of the Muslim conquest of the Levant
Arab slave owners
Sahabah hadith narrators
Burials at Al-Masjid an-Nabawi